Jach'a Kunturiri (Aymara jach'a big, kunturi condor, -(i)ri a suffix, Hispanicized spelling Jacha Condoriri) is a  mountain in the Andes of Bolivia. It is situated in the La Paz Department, Pacajes Province, on the border of the Calacoto Municipality and the Charaña Municipality. Jach'a Kunturiri lies south-west of the mountains Jisk'a Kunturiri ("little Kunturiri", Jiska Condoriri) and Taypi Kunturiri ("central Kunturiri", Taipi Condoriri).

References 

Mountains of La Paz Department (Bolivia)